"If All Men Were Brothers, Would You Let One Marry Your Sister?" is a science fiction short story by American writer Theodore Sturgeon. It first appeared in Harlan Ellison's anthology Dangerous Visions in 1967.

Plot

An Earthman visits the planet Vexvelt, which is shunned by the rest of the colonized universe for unknown reasons. He finds it a utopian paradise, but then discovers to his shock and horror that incest is actively encouraged there.

Reception
Paul Kincaid has called it "beautifully constructed" and "oddly lyrical", and a story "upon which Sturgeon's reputation can comfortably rest", but noted that its tone can be "loud and hectoring", and conceded that the basic premise of Vexvelt being shunned for a reason nobody knows "doesn't altogether make sense". Brian Stableford has described it as a "curious moral parable", whose "wild optimism (...) is as unappealing as it is unconvincing", while Brian Aldiss felt that the title was "cutesy", and Algis Budrys called it "just plain terrible".

Awards 
 Nebula Award for Best Novelette (1967, nominated)

References

External links
 
 Analysis with quotes at Everything2
 Quote at Oxford English Dictionary science fiction research website

1967 short stories
Short stories by Theodore Sturgeon
Dangerous Visions short stories
Incest in fiction